The 1981 WCT World Doubles was a men's tennis tournament played on indoor carpet courts at Olympia in London, England that was part of the 1981 Volvo Grand Prix. It was the tour finals for the doubles season of the WCT Tour section. The tournament was held from January 6 through January 11, 1981.

Final

Doubles

 Peter McNamara /  Paul McNamee defeated  Victor Amaya /  Hank Pfister 6–3, 2–6, 3–6, 6–3, 6–2

References

WCT World Doubles
World Championship Tennis World Doubles